Moldova competed at the 2006 Winter Olympics in Turin, Italy.

Biathlon

Cross-country skiing 

Sprint

Luge

References

 

Nations at the 2006 Winter Olympics
2006
Winter Olympics